Laurens County Airport  is a county-owned public-use airport in Laurens County, South Carolina, United States. It is located three nautical miles (6 km) east of the central business district of Laurens, South Carolina.

Although many U.S. airports use the same three-letter location identifier for the FAA and IATA, this facility is assigned LUX by the FAA but has no designation from the IATA (which assigned LUX to Findel Airport in Luxembourg).

Facilities and aircraft 
It has one runway designated 8/26 with an asphalt surface measuring 3,898 by 75 feet (1,188 x 23 m).

For the 12-month period ending May 22, 2009, the airport had 5,500 aircraft operations, an average of 15 per day: 94% general aviation, 3% air taxi, and 3% military. At that time there were 13 aircraft based at this airport, all single-engine.

References

External links 
 Airport page at Laurens County website
 Laurens County Airport (LUX) information from SC Division of Aeronautics
 Aerial image as of 2 February 1994 from USGS The National Map
 

Airports in South Carolina
Buildings and structures in Laurens County, South Carolina
Transportation in Laurens County, South Carolina